Siphopatella walshi (Syn. Crepidula walshi), common name : the eastern white slipper limpet, is a species of small sea snail, a slipper snail, a marine gastropod mollusk in the family Calyptraeidae, the slipper snails or slipper limpets, cup-and-saucer snails, and Chinese hat snails.

Distribution
This marine species can be found along Vietnam and Japan.

Description 
The size of an adult shell varies between 13 mm and 41 mm.

References

External links
 

Calyptraeidae
Gastropods described in 1858